Taras Jan Gomulka (born 16 September 2001), is an Australian professional football player who plays as a central midfielder for Brisbane Roar.

Club career

Adelaide United
Gomulka made his A-League debut for Adelaide United following the resumption of the 2019–20 A-League season which was postponed due to the COVID-19 pandemic in Australia, being named in the starting eleven for their clash against Brisbane Roar on 19 July 2020. He was substituted off in the 72nd minute. On 11 September 2020, the club announced Gomulka would depart after rejecting an offer to sign a senior deal.

Melbourne City
On 21 September 2020, Gomulka signed a three year deal with Melbourne City.

Brisbane Roar
In February 2023, Gomulka departed Melbourne City and joined Brisbane Roar.

Honours
Melbourne City
 A-League Premiership: 2020–21
 A-League Championship: 2021

References

External links

2001 births
Living people
Australian people of Ukrainian descent
Australian soccer players
Soccer players from Adelaide
Association football midfielders
Adelaide United FC players
Melbourne City FC players
Brisbane Roar FC players
National Premier Leagues players
A-League Men players
Australian people of Polish descent